Korla Pandit (September 16, 1921 – October 2, 1998), born John Roland Redd, was an American musician, composer, pianist, and organist. After moving to California in the late 1940s and getting involved in show business, Redd became known as "Korla Pandit", a French-Indian musician from New Delhi, India. However, Redd was actually a light-skinned African-American man from Missouri who passed as Indian. A pathbreaking musical performer in the early days of television, Redd is known for Korla Pandit's Adventures In Music; the show was the first all-music program on television. He also performed live and on radio and made various film appearances, becoming known as the "Godfather of Exotica". Redd maintained the Korla Pandit persona—both in public and in private—until the end of his life.

Early life, marriage, and family
In 1921, John Roland Redd was born in St. Louis, Missouri. His father, Ernest Redd, was an African-American Baptist pastor. Redd's mother, Doshia O'Nina Johnson, had Anglo and African ancestry. Both parents were descended from African-American enslaved persons. Redd was one of seven children and had light skin and straight hair.

In 1922, Redd's family moved to Hannibal, Missouri, where they lived for nine years. In 1931, they moved to Columbia, where Redd's father was pastor of the second-largest Baptist church in town. Given the Jim Crow restrictions in the state, Redd and his siblings attended racially segregated public schools for African-American children.

The Redd family later recalled John Redd as a musical prodigy from the age of three; he could hear a song once and have it memorized, and family members taught him to play piano from an early age. A contemporary of Redd's, jazz pianist Charles Thompson, knew Redd from Columbia, where they attended high school together. Later in life, Thompson remembered that as a teenager, Redd was the better piano player of the two. The whole Redd family was musically talented; Redd's two sisters sang, and one played piano. His older brother, Ernest Redd Jr. (known as "Speck" for his freckles) (1913–1974), also became a jazz pianist and later a band leader in Des Moines, Iowa. John and Ernest Redd played in groups with their older brother Harry, who was also a musician.

In the early 1940s, Redd met his sister Frances's white friend and roommate, Beryl June DeBeeson, a Disney artist and former dancer. They fell in love and in 1944 they married in Tijuana, Mexico, as interracial marriages (for any person deemed non-white, be they Native American, East Indian, Chinese, or Black) were then illegal in California. Redd and his wife had two sons.

Career as musician and entertainer

Hollywood and the creation of Korla Pandit
By the 1940s, Redd had moved from the Midwest to Los Angeles for more opportunity. His older sisters, Ruth and Frances, had already moved there by 1939. Redd used the name "Juan Rolando" to gain a job playing the organ on the Los Angeles radio station KMPC. Passing as a Mexican allowed him to join the Musicians Union (which was not open to African-Americans) and opened up additional opportunities for studio and club work.

Redd and his wife, Beryl, created a new entertainment persona for Redd's use. They thought Redd could have exotic appeal by passing as an Indian because most Americans did not know much about people from India. Beryl designed the makeup and clothing Redd used, and Redd took the name "Korla Pandit". He developed an elaborate history and continued to add to it during his career. He stated that he had been born in New Delhi, India, to a French opera singer and an Indian Brahmin government official. Supposedly raised in an upper-class Indian household, Redd claimed to have studied music in England as a child, arrived in the United States at age 12, and studied at the University of Chicago. Redd used the Korla Pandit persona—in public and in private—for the rest of his life.

In 1948, Redd created and played background music as Korla Pandit for the revival of radio's occult adventure series, Chandu the Magician, achieving atmospheric effects on the Novachord and the Hammond CV (ancestor of C3) electronic organ. In 1949, he became a regular organist on Hollywood Holiday, a show that was broadcast from a Los Angeles restaurant.

Television success

In 1948, while performing as Korla Pandit in Hollywood at a furrier's fashion show, Redd and his wife Beryl met television pioneer Klaus Landsberg. He offered Redd a television show with the stipulation that the musician would also provide accompaniment for Time for Beany, Bob Clampett's popular puppet show. Korla Pandit's Adventures In Music was first telecast on Los Angeles station KTLA in February 1949; it was the first all-music program on television. Viewers soon became familiar with the musical opening, "The Magnetic Theme." Landsberg insisted that Redd refrain from speaking and gaze into the camera as he played the Hammond organ and Steinway grand piano, often simultaneously. "Not once in 900 performances did he speak on camera, preferring instead to communicate with viewers via that hypnotic gaze."

Redd, as Korla Pandit, became an overnight star and one of early television's pioneering musical artists. He widened the array of music associated with the organ and popularized its use. While never dropping his Indian persona, Redd acquired notable friends such as actor Errol Flynn, comedian Bob Hope, and Sabu Dastagir, known for his roles in the documentary Elephant Boy (1937) and the feature Thief of Baghdad (1940).

In 1956, Redd moved to San Francisco and performed as Korla Pandit on San Francisco's KGO-TV. He began speaking on his show, espousing a blend of spiritual ideas that entranced many of his fans. He became friends with Paramahansa Yogananda, Indian spiritual leader of the Self Realization Fellowship. Their relationship was close enough that Yogananda wrote an introduction to the liner notes for one of Redd's records, and Redd played at Yogananda's funeral. The late 1950s was the time of the Beat generation, which saw many Americans embrace spirituality and Eastern religions, while rejecting traditional values including the need to conform to society's norms and economic materialism. Redd read widely and incorporated a variety of these topics in his talks, including mysticism and Zen philosophy. In 1967, Redd and his family moved to Vancouver, British Columbia, to prevent his sons from being drafted during the Vietnam War.

Later career
After moving to Canada, Redd returned regularly to the San Francisco and Los Angeles areas for work. In the 1970s, as his television popularity waned, he supplemented his income with a variety of increased personal appearances and performances. Continuing to use the Korla Pandit persona, Redd performed at supper clubs, supermarket openings, car agencies, music and department stores, pizza restaurants, lectures, music seminars, private lessons, and the theater organ circuit. He made a cameo appearance as Korla Pandit in Tim Burton's biopic Ed Wood (1994), which drew renewed attention to him as a performer. He performed as a musician in the film.

Redd's career was revived in the 1990s, and he attracted a new generation, taking them under his wing. "The Tiki-lounge music revival gave Korla one last career resurgence and cult following. He recorded with The Muffs...." Redd also performed a sold-out show at the legendary Bimbo's 365 Club in San Francisco.

Death and revelations
Redd died in Petaluma, California on October 2, 1998. He was survived by his wife, Beryl, and their sons, Shari and Koram. (Koram would later rename himself John Pandit.)

Two years after Redd's death, R.J. Smith, magazine editor of Los Angeles, published an article revealing Redd's true ancestry.

During his life, Redd kept in touch with his family of origin, but he wore his turban and did not bring his sons when visiting with them. According to Redd's nephew, Ernest Redd, "Among the family we knew what he was doing and very little was said about it. There was times when he would come by, and it was kind of like a sneak visit. He might come at night sometime and be gone before we got up. He had to separate himself from the family to a certain extent. They would go to see him play, but they wouldn’t speak to him. They would go to his show and then they would leave, and the family would greet him at a later time". Allyson Hobbs, assistant professor of history at Stanford University, wrote A Chosen Exile: A History of Racial Passing in American Life (2014). Having met members of Redd's extended family of origin, Hobbs has said that they "felt he was very authentic and were very close to him". Redd's sons heard rumors about their father's background, but were only told of his (and their own) African-American heritage after his death. Shari Pandit died before the publication of Smith's 2001 article, and John Pandit rejected Smith's findings.

Intrigued by the Smith article, John Turner and Eric Christensen, retired TV producers who had each known Redd in his later years, made a documentary entitled Korla (2014). They wrote and produced the film together and Turner directed it. The duo interviewed an array of friends, fellow musicians, and family, discussing Redd's life and achievements and exploring the complexities of racial identity. After Korla was widely released, various media outlets commented on Redd's history, casting it as a classic American story of self-invention.

Filmography

On screen

Acting
Something to Live For (1952) – Hindu Man (uncredited)
Which Way Is Up? (1977) – The Hindu
Ed Wood (1994) – Indian musician

As himself
Adventures in Music (television series) (1948)
All Star Revue (television series) (1952)
KTLA at 40: A Celebration of Los Angeles Television (television movie) (1986)
Korla (documentary) (2015)

As musical performer
Ed Wood (1994) (performer, writer and arranger of "Nautch Dance")

As composer
Adventures in Music (television series) (1948)
Time for Beany (television series) (1951) (episode #1.421)

Notes

References

External links
Korla Pandit official site, managed by Verne Langdon

1921 births
1998 deaths
American organists
American male organists
Exotica
Musicians from St. Louis
Musicians from Los Angeles
Theatre organists
20th-century American musicians
African-American people
American people of French descent
Musicians from Columbia, Missouri
African Americans in Columbia, Missouri
20th-century organists
20th-century American male musicians
American expatriates in Canada
Indian-American history
Indian-American culture in Missouri
Indian-American culture in Los Angeles